This list comprises all players who have played for Orlando Pride which dates from their inaugural National Women's Soccer League season in 2016 to present.

A "†" denotes players who featured in a matchday squad with the team but never made an appearance.

Bolded players are currently under contract by Orlando Pride.

Stats include all competitive matches (NWSL regular season, playoffs and Challenge Cup).

All stats accurate as of match played October 1, 2022.

Players

Outfield players

Goalkeepers

By nationality 
In total, 88 players representing 13 different countries have played for Orlando Pride. 

Note: Countries indicate national team as defined under FIFA eligibility rules. Players may hold more than one non-FIFA nationality.

Sources
 NWSL player list

References 

Orlando Pride
 
Association football player non-biographical articles
Orlando Pride players